Government Girls Science and Technical College Potiskum is a public science and technical boarding secondary school established in 1979 to provide girl-child education in Potiskum, Yobe State, Nigeria. The current principal of the school is Hajiya Adama Abdulkarim.

Departments 

The school has the following major departments:
Science Department
Technical Department
Computer Department
Humanities/Art Department

References

Girls' schools in Nigeria
Potiskum
Secondary schools in Nigeria